The Orient Commercial Joint Stock Bank (also known as Oricombank and OCB) is a large bank located in Vietnam. Its Swift code is ORCOVNVX.

As of April 2007, 10% of Oricombank was owned by BNP Paribas, a French banking group.

On August 26, 2009 OCB agreed to increase steadily share ownership for BNP Paribas from 10% to 15% and to 20% after the approval of the State Bank of Vietnam and the Government.

In December 2017, BNP Paribas has sold all 74.7 million shares in OCB and is no longer a shareholder.

In January 2020, Aozora Bank of Japan purchased a 15% stake in OCB.

On January 28, 2021, OCB started trading on the Ho Chi Minh Stock Exchange under the ticker OCB.

Key shareholders
Aozora Bank
Ben Thanh Group
Financial committee of Ho Chi Minh City local Communist Party
Vietcombank
Saigon General Service Corporation (Savico)

Branch/transaction office network
Up to July 27, 2010, there was a network of Oricombank present in 17 provinces and cities throughout Vietnam, including:
1 head office
1 central transaction office
24 branches
46 transaction offices
4 saving offices

Staff

By the end of 8/2010 total head count of Oricombank is 1,539 people.

Milestones
01/10/2010 : OCB joins hands with Liberty.
24/05/2010 : OCB completed the data conversion and put T24 Core Banking System in use in the whole bank
10/03/2010 : Cooperation signing ceremony between OCB – Diebold
29/12/2009  : Increased charter capital to VND 2.000 billion
13/11/2009 : Within the framework of Vietnam – France Entrepreneur forum which was organized by the France Embassy in cooperation with VCCI in Hanoi, Orient Commercial Bank (OCB) has signed memorandum of understanding in regard to the increase of capital contribution of BNP Paribas (France) in OCB to 20% in the appropriate time in the year 2010 and following the approval of the State Bank of Vietnam and the Government
16/09/2009 : OCB and Ernst & Young Vietnam has officially signed a contract to provide support services to perfect the system of internal credit ratings
26/08/2009 : Orient Commercial Bank signed agreement with BNP Paribas to increase OCB’s capital contribution from 10% to 15%
05/02/2009 : OCB started the implementation of Core Banking System Project
30/12/2008 : Increased charter capital to VND 1,474,477
19/12/2008 : Signing ceremony for the implementation of core banking system between OCB and Temenos
28/02/2008 : Strategic alliance between Orient Commercial Bank - BNP Paribas was signed in Paris, France
29/12/2006 : Increased charter capital to VND 567 billion
20/12/2005 : Increased charter capital to VND 300 billion
06/06/2005 : Launched Lucky Oricombank Card
Participated in express remittance system of Western Union
Participated in Society for Worldwide Interbank Financial Telecommunication (SWIFT)
10/06/1996 : Orient Commercial Joint Stock Bank (OCB) was granted license of operation in 13/04/1996 with initial charter capital of VND 70 million by the State Bank of Vietnam

See also
List of banks in Vietnam

External links
Website Orient Commercial Joint Stock Bank
Website The State Bank of Vietnam

References

Banks of Vietnam
BNP Paribas